Chelonoidis alburyorum is an extinct species of land tortoise that lived from the late Pleistocene to around 1400 CE. The species was discovered and described by Richard Franz and Shelley E. Franz, the findings being published in 2009.

Name
The specific epithet, alburyorum, is in honor of Bahamian naturalist Nancy Ann Albury.

Fossil 
The shell of C. alburyorum was 47 cm (19 inches) in length. Fossils of the species were discovered in Sawmill Sink, a blue hole. Other sites where C. alburyorum fossils have been found include cave systems and an inland deep blue sink hole. All fossils of C. alburyorum have been found in the Bahamas.

Extinction
C. alburyorum was the last-surviving of the West Indian Chelonoidis, persisting up to 1170 CE on the Abacos, up to 1200 CE on Grand Turk, and up to 1400 CE on the Middle Caicos, just under a century prior to European colonization of the islands.

Reference 

alburyorum
Reptiles described in 2009
Extinct turtles
Holocene extinctions